Hunting Badger is the fourteenth crime fiction novel in the Joe Leaphorn / Jim Chee Navajo Tribal Police series by Tony Hillerman, first published in 1999.

Armed robbers at a Ute Indian gambling casino shoot two security guards, one fatally. Sgt. Chee gets involved in the hunt for the robbers, while retired Lt. Leaphorn gets drawn in by one who will not go to the FBI or local police. Chee and Leaphorn work together again.

One reviewer considers this to be "Hillerman at his best." while another calls it a "Pleasing lesser work from the doyen of the regional mystery." The novel "continues to hold a high place on every national best-seller list." The basics of the plot were inspired by the "intensive manhunt that followed the murder of Officer Dale Claxton on May 4, 1998. . . only with more satisfying results." Most reviewers praised the descriptions of the dramatic landscape ("the scenery spectacular", "the most picturesque country in the Southwest", "the scenic Southwest's beauty") and one notes "several new insights into the mysteries of Navajo culture and a story with enough twists and surprises to make readers glad they checked in."

Plot summary

Sophisticated robbers shoot the security guards at the Ute Casino, turn off the electricity and then steal the cash bagged and ready to be picked up for deposit to the bank. Cap Stoner is killed outright, while young Teddy Bai is severely wounded, but immediately suspected by the FBI as the "inside man" for the robbery. Chee returns from a long vacation in Alaska to be drawn into the investigation at the request of Officer Manuelito, who does not believe Bai is guilty. Roy Gershwin draws Leaphorn into the investigation by saying that he knows who did it, leaving a list of three names with Leaphorn. Why does he choose Leaphorn, and not the police or the FBI? The FBI announces that the perpetrators fled in an airplane stolen from Mr. Timms.

Chee and his friend Cowboy Dashee revisit the site where the escape vehicle was found with two sets of footprints, and visit the Timms place nearby. They track the aircraft to the second landholding of Timms, so the criminals are still on the loose. Leaphorn travels with Prof. Bourebonette, who is working near where the men on Gershwin's list live. Leaphorn finds Everett Jory in his house, shot dead, leaving a suicide note on his computer screen. The note names his two confederates in the crime, George Badger Ironhand and Alexander Buddy Baker, who misled Jory as to the use of the money. The pick-up truck parked at his place is the second seen at the Casino. The FBI gets active in the case again. The officer in charge, Mr. Cabot, directs a huge systematic search of the area near Jory's home (near the border of Arizona with Utah), with the local police forces doing the searching. Prof. Bourebonette interviews a Ute woman with Leaphorn in company. The woman relates the story of Ironhand from the early 20th century, a man who fooled the Navajos in pursuit of him. He had a son who was a skilled fighter in the Vietnam War, still alive. About the same time, Chee visits his uncle Frank Sam Nakai, finding him mistakenly in a hospital. Once he and Manuelito move Nakai back to his home, Nakai warns Chee of Ironhand and the coal mine, and gives Chee his final lesson on the Nightway ceremonial. Then Nakai dies of lung cancer.

Leaphorn learns from retired FBI agent Kennedy (the start of the retired cops group) that the broken radio found in the abandoned vehicle had wires cut inside, like a careful sabotage. He realizes that the robbers are hidden where they get no news, so will be appearing soon; one of them fishes for old newspapers at a gas station and drives off just as Chee drives in to fill up his gas tank. The station owner gives enough description to indicate it is Ironhand. The vehicle, stolen like the first one, is found abandoned near Gothic Creek Canyon. In the second day of searching, Chee sprains his ankle. After talking with Leaphorn, he calls on the head of the EPA project at the airport that is using a helicopter to scan for uranium, which is usually found in or near old coal mines. They agree to an extra bit of flying, and Chee finds the long mine shaft likely built by Mormons in the prior century, since abandoned, not visible from the search area, and once used by the original Ironhand. Cabot is scornful of this information, claiming they searched that place already, finding no signs of habitation.

Roy Gershwin meets with Leaphorn again, claiming to be afraid he will be killed as an informer. Chee calls to report the success in finding the mine shaft while Gershwin is present, and Gershwin sees Leaphorn mark it on a map. Chee falls on his injured ankle, so Manuelito takes him to the clinic and then home, where Leaphorn meets them with his new theory of the crime. Leaphorn learned that Jory had lawsuits against both Timms and Gershwin, and that Gershwin is in poor financial condition, worse if Jory's lawsuit prevails. Gershwin likely typed that suicide note after killing Jory. They visit Timms, learning that Gershwin is just ahead of them. They proceed to the top of the mine shaft, finding Gershwin's vehicle there. They position themselves out of sight, with Leaphorn directing their actions. They hear gunshots from the mine. Gershwin walks from the old structure and Leaphorn confronts him, holding a rifle. Gershwin admits to shooting at both Baker and Ironhand, saying it was self-defense. Baker lies dead. Leaphorn introduces Chee, while Manuelito radios for support. Gershwin goes for his own pistol, so Chee tells Gershwin to drop it, which he does. Ironhand shoots Gershwin from beneath the plywood over the mine shaft. Gershwin lies dead. When Cabot arrives, Leaphorn tells him to look in Gershwin's truck for the casino money, which he finds intact. Riding away from the crowded scene, Chee begins to realize that Leaphorn likes him, and that he is beginning to like Bernadette Manuelito.

Characters
Joe Leaphorn: Retired lieutenant of the Navajo Tribal Police, widower, who lives in Window Rock, Arizona.
Jim Chee: Officer in the Navajo Tribal Police, recently returned from a trip to Alaska. He is again based in Shiprock, New Mexico as a sergeant, having had enough of being an Acting Lieutenant.
Emma Leaphorn: Deceased wife of Joe, about whom we learn through his memories of her and his life with her, and comparisons between her and Leaphorn's friend Louisa.
Louisa Bourebonette: Professor of cultural anthropology, friend of Leaphorn, who was introduced in Coyote Waits. She is now interviewing Utes for their old story, and uses Leaphorn's guest bedroom as a base for reaching her interviews.
Teddy Bye: Deputy Sheriff in Montezuma County who works a second job as security for the Ute Casino. He is engaged to be married. He is shot multiple times by the thieves, yet considered by the FBI as the inside man of the sophisticated robbery as he recovers in the hospital.
Cap Stoner: Retired police captain who works as security for the Ute Casino. He is killed by thieves who steal the casino's cash.
Bernadette (Bernie) Manuelito: Young officer recently transferred back to Shiprock from Tuba City office of Navajo Tribal Police, so she can more easily care for her ill mother; she was introduced in The Fallen Man.
Captain Largo: Superior officer for both Chee and Manuelito at the Shiprock office of the Navajo Tribal Police.
Albert "Cowboy" Dashee: Hopi man, friend of Chee, and Deputy Sheriff in Apache County. He was introduced in The Dark Wind.
Hosteen Frank Sam Nakai: Hatalii and uncle to Chee, who is dying from lung cancer. He gives Chee the last lesson in the Nightway ceremony, so that Chee can decide whether he is strong enough in himself to help others in the Navajo ceremonials. He appeared in Sacred Clowns and The First Eagle.
Jay Kennedy: Retired FBI agent who Leaphorn calls when deciding how to handle the information shared with him by Roy Gershwin. Leaphorn worked with Kennedy many times before his own retirement. He was introduced in Skinwalkers.
Roy Gershwin: Politically oriented man who selects Leaphorn as the one to learn the names of three culprits in the murder and thievery at the Ute Casino. He is threatened with a suit by Jory that would deprive him of his grazing lease near Montezuma Creek. He murders Jory, and is fatally shot by Ironhand in the final scene.
Alice Deal: New Mexico state police dispatcher who directs Chee as to where Bye took flying lessons.
Jim Edgar: He works at Farmington, New Mexico airport where Teddy Bye took flying lessons from Four Corners Flight, and where the DOE helicopter is based.
Mr. Timms: Owner of an old airplane (50-year-old model L-17) who claims his plane was stolen by the thieves, leading the FBI to declare the robbers used it to flee. He made a false insurance claim for theft. He owns two grazing leases.
George (Badger) Ironhand: Decorated Vietnam War veteran, sharpshooter, and a Green Beret, in a local militia group, son of a well-known Ute of the early 20th century (in Ute lore), who stole from the Navajos and baffled them by his method of escape in Gothic Creek canyon. He is part of the team persuaded by Gershwin to carry out this robbery.
Alexander (Buddy) Baker: Third man in the original group to carry out the Ute Casino robbery, in a local militia group. He once worked in the casino, the "inside man" assumed essential for this heist. He is murdered by Gershwin while in hiding.
Everett Jory: Man with strong political views, once had his own radio program. Jory is a lawyer and a man fond of legal suits, with one pending against Gershwin. Leaphorn finds him dead. Thought at first to be a suicide, he was murdered by Gershwin who also typed a suicide note on Jory's computer leading the police to know the names of the two in hiding.
Damon Cabot: FBI agent-in-charge of the Ute Casino case, newly arrived from Philadelphia.
P. J. (Pattie) Collins: EPA staffer who leads the project to identify exposed uranium, which is often tied with old coal mines; she allows Chee to ride along the day they scan Gothic Creek canyon. (based on a real person per Author's Note.)
Tom McKissick: Pilot of helicopter owned by the US Department of Energy, which is equipped specially to detect and image the radiation, who conducts the survey of lands with uranium on the Navajo Reservation for the EPA. He, the co-pilot and the tech are based on real people per the Author's Note.
Rosemary: Engaged to Teddy Bye.
Janet Pete: Lawyer in federal Department of Justice. She is half Navajo and grew up in the cities of the East Coast. She returns to work in the Four Corners area after being home in Washington DC. She had been engaged to Chee, but that connection is over. She is assigned to defend Teddy Bye. She was introduced in Skinwalkers.

Allusions to real persons and events

In the interviews that Professor Louisa Bourebonette holds with an old Ute woman, old enmities began to upset Joe Leaphorn. Besides the murdering thief of the current story, he reflects on the history in the 19th century, when Utes joined with the U.S. Army under Kit Carson to put the Navajos down and ultimately to drive them out of their homeland. From the time of the Spanish, the Utes and Paiutes had been enemies to the Navajos, though all living in the same large area of the Colorado Plateau.

In the Author's Note, Hillerman explains that the EPA team and the helicopter pilot and co-pilot were based on real people conducting the project to map exposed uranium on the Navajo Reservation, as a start to remediation from the uranium mining done for federal government projects.

Geography
In his 2011 book Tony Hillerman's Navajoland: Hideouts, Haunts, and Havens in the Joe Leaphorn and Jim Chee Mysteries, author  has listed the following 48 geographical locations, real and fictional, mentioned in Hunting Badger. 

Aneth, UT
Aztec, NM
Beclabito, NM
Black Creek Valley, AZ
Blanding, UT
Bluff, UT
Bluff Bench, UT
Casa Del Eco Mesa, UT
Chinle, AZ
Chinle Wash, AZ
Chuska Mountains, NM & AZ
Colorado River, CO, UT, & AZ
Comb Ridge, AZ & UT
Cortez, CO
Desert Creek, UT
Dinétah, NM
Durango, CO
Farmington, NM
Flagstaff, AZ
Four Corners, NM, AZ, UT, & CO
Gallup, NM
Glen Canyon, AZ
Gothic Creek, UT
Gothic Creek Canyon, UT
Jicarilla Apache Reservation, NM
Lake Powell, UT & AZ
Lukachukai, AZ
Manuelito Plateau, NM
Mexican Water Trading Post, AZ
Montezuma Creek, UT
Mount Taylor, NM
Narbona Pass, NM
Nokaito Bench, UT
Recapture Creek, UT
Red Mesa, AZ
Red Mesa Chapter, AZ
Rough Rock, AZ
San Juan River, CO, NM, & UT
Shiprock (Community), NM
Sleeping Ute Mountain, CO
Southern Ute Reservation, CO
Toadlena, NM
Towoac, CO
Tuba City, AZ
Two Grey Hills, NM
Ute Casino (fictitious establishment)
White Mesa Ute Reservation, UT
Window Rock, AZ

Reviews

Kirkus Reviews finds this a lesser work from Hillerman, but pleasing, and with the best tricks at the end:

On May 4, 1998, a Colorado police officer was shot and killed when he pulled over a stolen water truck. One of the three thieves killed himself soon thereafter; the other two remain at large despite the FBI’s scorched-earth (and, Hillerman hints in a brief introduction, insensitive) search tactics. But what if Sgt. Jim Chee and retired Lt. Joe Leaphorn, of the Navajo Tribal Police, had been on the job? Hillerman (The First Eagle, 1998, etc.) here reimagines the crime as a Ute Casino holdup that leaves the security chief dead and one of his rent-a-cops, whom the police wrongheadedly assume to have been the inside man, wounded. Chee, back in Shiprock to investigate the theft of an ancient Cessna presumably used in the robbers’ high-country getaway, soon finds his path crisscrossing that of Leaphorn, called back into action still again by old rancher Roy Gershwin’s insistence that he can name the perps. Nosing around among his friends, acquaintances, former colleagues, and former adversaries, Leaphorn soon walks in on a suicide scene that confirms Gershwin’s confidence. But how can even a wily old veteran like Leaphorn track down the surviving thieves, especially the one dubbed —Badger— who’s reputed to be a witch? Pleasing lesser work from the doyen of the regional mystery—a master who, like his hero, keeps his best tricks till last.

Publishers Weekly says there are new insights into Navajo culture and many twists and turns in first class writing:

Picking up a new Hillerman book has the high comfort level of revisiting a favorite old Western hotel like the Bishop's Lodge in Santa Fe or the Ahwani at Yosemite--the accommodations will always be first class and the scenery spectacular. Not that Hillerman ignores the passage of time: his two Navajo cops, Jim Chee and Joe Leaphorn, age and change as we all do. There's a moment in the novel when Chee meets with his retired former boss at the Anasazi Inn dining room in Farmington, N. Mex. "He had looked right past the corner table and the stocky old duffer sitting there with a plump middle-aged woman without recognizing Joe Leaphorn.... He had seen the Legendary Lieutenant in civilian attire before, but the image he carried in his mind was of Leaphorn in uniform." As for the prickly Sergeant Chee, he has to contend with physical problems as well as with the end of one romance and the beginning of another--not to mention the very real possibility of being picked off by a sniper during the search for the men who robbed a casino owned by the Ute tribe. In a rare author's note, Hillerman talks about an actual 1998 case in which the FBI turned the killing of a Colorado police officer into a gigantic fiasco. The shadow of that failed investigation hangs over the search in this book, leading to many anti-FBI jibes (If the Federal Bureau of Ineptitude says it, it must be true, another retired cop tells Leaphorn). As usual in recent Hillerman books, the action goes on mostly inside the minds of his two lead characters. But there is one splendid helicopter ride into Gothic Creek Canyon that should speed up the calmest heart, several new insights into the mysteries of Navajo culture and a story with enough twists and surprises to make readers glad they checked in.

Nicholas Allison remarks that all the cardinal virtues of Hillermn's writing are evident, including pellucid prose and characters who seem to rise off the page:

The marvellous Hunting Badger is Tony Hillerman's 13th novel featuring Navajo Tribal Police officers Joe Leaphorn and Jim Chee. Here the two cops (who appeared in separate books early on but whose paths now routinely cross) are working two angles of the same case: Catching the right-wing militiamen who pulled off a violent heist at an Indian casino. Hillerman serves up plenty of action and enough plot twists to keep readers off balance, leading up to a satisfyingly tense climax in which Leaphorn and Chee stalk a killer in his hideout. But through it all, the cardinal Hillerman virtues are in evidence: Economical, pellucid prose; a panoply of Indian-country characters who seem to rise right up off the page; vivid evocations of the Southwest's bleak beauty and rich insights into Navajo life and culture. (Hillerman once told an interviewer that the highest compliment he'd ever received was hearing that many Navajo readers assumed that he himself was Navajo--he's not.)

While first-time readers will find plenty to enjoy in Hunting Badger, it holds special pleasures for long-time fans. There's more and deeper contact between Leaphorn and Chee and we continued to see deeper into the prickly Leaphorn's human side (though presented without fuss or sentimentality). Chee finally begins to get over Janet Pete (it took about six books) and inch toward a new love interest. And in a moving section involving Chee's spiritual teacher Frank Sam Nakai, the shaman provides a key insight into the case.

In a world teeming with "sense of place" mysteries--set in Seattle, Alaska, the Arizona desert or Chicago--it can be a shock to return to Hillerman, who started it all, and realise just how superior he is to the rest of the pack.

Library Journal recommends this mystery, weaving Navajo and Ute myths into the fabric of an action-packed story:

Navajo tribal police officers Joe Leaphorn (ret.) and Jim Chee are united again, this time in an effort to catch heavily armed right-wing militiamen who robbed an Indian casino and who may or may not be involved in a previous mishandled manhunt. Navajo and Ute myths and history are successfully woven into a modern mystery. Insights into Leaphorn's and Chee's personalities are unveiled against the backdrop of the scenic Southwest's beauty, other interesting characters, and peeks into Navajo life. The tale, which is well-read by George Guidall, also contains plenty of action and surprises, along with dynamic central characters struggling to live in the modern world without sacrificing their culture. Recommended.

In an interview with the author about his writing style and method for devising plots, Jeff Guinn (of the Fort Worth Star-Telegram) says that "Hunting Badger . . . continues to hold a high place on every national best-seller list. It moves at a brisk pace and is characterized, as always, by the author's insights into tribal culture. It bespeaks the care Hillerman took to make it at least a little different from previous Leaphorn/Chee adventures."

Gary Dretzka, writing in the Chicago Tribune, notes that the "novel was inspired by the intensive manhunt that followed the murder of Officer Dale Claxton on May 4, 1998, near Cortez, Colo., and the subsequent wounding of three other police officers. . . . To this day, Navajo tribal police shake their heads in wonder at how badly botched the whole thing was. That scenario is repeated in Hunting Badger, only with more satisfying results." Dretzka explains 
that "Hillerman stages the manhunt in some of the most picturesque country in the Southwest and, as usual, easily transports the reader to the edge of a high mesa from which to observe the mayhem. Besides introducing a few new legends and colorful residents of the Nation, the author also has a good bit of fun playing matchmaker. This is Hillerman at his best."

References

Bibliography

External links
Hunting Badger at Tony Hillerman Portal

1999 American novels
Novels by Tony Hillerman
HarperCollins books
Novels set in Arizona
Novels set in New Mexico